The Canton of Senones is a former French administrative and electoral grouping of communes in the Vosges département of eastern France and in the region of Lorraine. It was disbanded following the French canton reorganisation which came into effect in March 2015. It consisted of 18 communes, which joined the canton of Raon-l'Étape in 2015. It had 9,702 inhabitants (2012).

It covered an area to the north of Saint-Dié-des-Vosges. One of 9 cantons in the Arrondissement of Saint-Dié-des-Vosges, the Canton of Senones had its administrative centre at Senones.

Composition
The Canton of Senones comprised the following 18 communes:

 Ban-de-Sapt
 Belval
 Châtas 
 Denipaire 
 Grandrupt 
 Hurbache 
 Ménil-de-Senones 
 Le Mont
 Moussey 
 Moyenmoutier 
 La Petite-Raon 
 Le Puid 
 Saint-Jean-d'Ormont 
 Saint-Stail 
 Le Saulcy
 Senones 
 Le Vermont 
 Vieux-Moulin

History
The Canton of Senones was created in 1793 as part of the annexation by France of the Principality of Salm-Salm.  In 1801 the canton was expanded when it absorbed the Canton of le Puid and some communes from the Canton of Allarmont.   However, in 1806 the communes acquired from Allarment were lost to the Canton of Raon-l'Étape.

References

Senones
2015 disestablishments in France
States and territories disestablished in 2015